Kalyan Mitra (born 1939; year of death missing) was a Bangladeshi writer, actor, director and playwright. He received the Bangla Academy Literary Award in 1972 for his play. He died.

Career 
Kalyan Mitra was born in 1939 in Kushtia. His plays were performed on stage and radio in the 1960s and 1970s. Most of his plays were published from Bogra. Although he was involved in social drama, he wrote plays on the liberation war of Bangladesh. His satirical play "Jallader Darbare" and satirical play "Mir Jafarer Rujnamca" from Swadhin Bangla Betar Kendra in 1971 caused quite a stir. Much like the Kolkata style, he used to create characters and arrange events in plays.

Awards and honors 
 Bangla Academy Literary Award (1972)
 Prabha Natyagosthi Award
 Lok Natyadal Gold Medal (2019)

Bibliography 
 দায়ী কে (1968)
 শপথ (1967)
 শুভ বিবাহ (1967)
 প্রদীপশিখা (1967)
 কুয়াশা কান্না (1967)
 অনন্যা (1967)
 ত্রিরত্ন (1967)
 সাগর সেঁচা মানিক (1968)
 টাকা আনা পাই (1968)
 পাশের বাড়ি
 বাঈজী
 লালন ফকির (1977)
 সূর্য মহল

See also 
 List of Bangla Academy Literary Award recipients (1970–1979)

References

External links 
 Banglapedia -Kalyan Mitra

Recipients of Bangla Academy Award
1939 births

Year of death missing
People from Kushtia District
Bangladeshi dramatists and playwrights
Bangladeshi writers